Lot's Ait  is a  ait (river island) in the Thames. It is on the Tideway near Brentford, in the London Borough of Hounslow, England.

History
Lot's Ait, covering , has a very narrow divide from larger, downstream Brentford Ait. It was for centuries used for growing of grass and osiers: basket willows, used for basketry, furniture, and cart-making, as well as cattle fodder. It was once known as Barbel Island being a fruitful area for fishing. It contained a yard where barges were repaired until 1980, when it was sold. It acquired a wild character with naturalised willows, rotting boats and rusting dock roofs and became a haven for wildlife. In 2002, the island was offered for sale with outline planning permission for a restaurant, a leisure facility and boat storage. It is accessible by footbridge, at low tide in sturdy boots across the thick, shifting mud bed of the channel against the Brentford shore, and by water from the slipway Goats Wharf off Brentford High Street.

In 2011, a lease on the island was granted to a local company, John's Boat Works, which commenced boat building works on the island for the first time in over 30 years and put it back into use. In January 2012, a new footbridge, Dahlia Bridge, was installed to link the island to the Brentford bank of the Thames at Smith Hill. It was designed by Beckett Rankine and built and installed by MSO Marine.

In popular culture
Film scenes in
 The African Queen
 Stratton
Lots Ait boatworks featured in an episode of George Clarke's Amazing Spaces

See also
Islands in the River Thames

Notes

References

External links
 Lot's Ait.com official site

Geography of the London Borough of Hounslow
Islands of the River Thames
Islands of London